The 2022 Blue-Emu Maximum Pain Relief 200 was the fifth stock car race of the 2022 NASCAR Camping World Truck Series and the 20th iteration of the event. The race was held on Thursday, April 7, 2022, in Martinsville, Virginia at Martinsville Speedway, a  permanent oval-shaped short track. The race was run over 200 laps. William Byron of Spire Motorsports would win the race after leading 94 laps. This was Byron's eighth career truck series win, and his first of the season. This was also the second win for Spire Motorsports in NASCAR. To fill out the podium, Johnny Sauter of ThorSport Racing and Kyle Busch of Kyle Busch Motorsports would finish 2nd and 3rd, respectively.

Several drivers would make their debut in this race: Dillon Steuer, Chase Janes,  Blake Lothian, and Kaden Honeycutt. Due to practice and qualifying being cancelled from inclement weather, and having no owner points, Justin Carroll and Jake Garcia would not qualify for the race, therefore not being able to make their first start.

Background 
Martinsville Speedway is an NASCAR-owned stock car racing track located in Henry County, in Ridgeway, Virginia, just to the south of Martinsville. At  in length, it is the shortest track in the NASCAR Cup Series. The track was also one of the first paved oval tracks in NASCAR, being built in 1947 by H. Clay Earles. It is also the only remaining race track that has been on the NASCAR circuit from its beginning in 1948.

Entry list 

 (R) denotes rookie driver.
 (i) denotes driver who is ineligible for series driver points.

 ** – Withdrew prior to the event.

Practice/Qualifying 
Practice and qualifying was scheduled to be held on Thursday, April 7, but was both cancelled due to inclement weather. The starting lineup would be based on a qualifying matrix. Zane Smith would score the pole for the race.

Full qualifying results

Race results 
Stage 1 Laps: 50

Stage 2 Laps: 50

Stage 3 Laps: 100

Standings after the race 

Drivers' Championship standings

Note: Only the first 10 positions are included for the driver standings.

References 

2022 NASCAR Camping World Truck Series
NASCAR races at Martinsville Speedway
Blue-Emu Maximum Pain Relief 200
Blue-Emu Maximum Pain Relief 200